Aidenbachstraße is an U-Bahn station in Munich on the U3.

In 2014, construction is expected to start on a  tangential extension of route 16  of the Munich tramway from its existing terminus at Romansplatz to an interchange at Aidenbachstraße station.

References

Munich U-Bahn stations
Railway stations in Germany opened in 1989
1989 establishments in West Germany